WDCE is a Variety formatted broadcast radio station licensed to and serving Richmond, Virginia.  WDCE is owned and operated by University of Richmond. Its predecessor, WCRC-AM, first went on air on November 2, 1961, operating with 600 kilocycles on AM and 27 watts of power. WCRC purportedly set a Virginia collegiate radio record in 1962, when they broadcast continuously from January 8 at 4:55 PM to January 12 at 9:00 PM, a total of 100 hours and 5 minutes. It began 24-hour coverage on February 1, 1965. WCRC-AM switched to WDCE-FM on September 7, 1977.

References

External links
 WDCE 90.1 FM Online
 

1977 establishments in Virginia
Variety radio stations in the United States
Radio stations established in 1977
DCE
DCE
DCE